Jaime Mauricio Gómez Sandoval (born May 10, 1980 in Santa Ana, El Salvador) is a Salvadoran footballer who plays for Salvadoran second division side Titán.

Club career
Gómez made his professional debut with local club FAS in April 2000 against Águila after spending a year at their reserves team. He would stay with FAS for seven years, winning 5 league titles in the process. In 2006, he moved to Once Municipal, only to leave them the next year for Isidro Metapán. He joined Juventud Independiente in 2008, but won the second division title with Titán when beating Juventud in December 2010.

International career
Gómez made his debut for El Salvador in a December 2001 friendly match against Haiti which was staged in Miami. The game proved to be his sole international appearance.

References

External links
 

Profile - Isidro Metapán

1980 births
Living people
Sportspeople from Santa Ana, El Salvador
Association football midfielders
Salvadoran footballers
El Salvador international footballers
C.D. FAS footballers
Once Municipal footballers
A.D. Isidro Metapán footballers
C.D. Juventud Independiente players